Mount is a village in the parish of Warleggan in east Cornwall, England. It lies south-west of Warleggan village.

References

Villages in Cornwall